Minuscule 362 (in the Gregory-Aland numbering), Νλ37 (Soden), is a Greek minuscule manuscript of the New Testament, on parchment. Palaeographically it has been assigned to the 13th century.

Description 

The codex contains the text of the Gospel of Luke 6:29-12:10 on 314 parchment leaves with catena (from Chrysostomos, Gregory of Nazianzus, Gregory of Nyssa, Isidor, Theodoret, etc.). It is written in one column per page, in 32 lines per page, in red ink.

Text 

The Greek text of the codex is a representative of the Byzantine text-type. Aland placed it in Category V.
It has some unusual readings.
It was not examined by Claremont Profile Method.

History 

The manuscript was cited together with codices 201 and 370 by Giovanni Lami in De eruditione Apostolorum (Florence, 1738, p. 239). It was described by Bernard de Montfaucon, who gave for it 13th century.

The manuscript was added to the list of New Testament manuscripts by Scholz (1794-1852). 
It was examined by Philip E. Pusey and Burgon. C. R. Gregory saw it in 1886.

The manuscript is currently housed at the Biblioteca Laurentiana (Conv. Soppr. 176) in Florence.

See also 

 List of New Testament minuscules
 Biblical manuscript
 Textual criticism

References

Further reading 

 Giovanni Lami, De eruditione Apostolorum (Florence, 1738), p. 239. [codex XXX]

Greek New Testament minuscules
13th-century biblical manuscripts